The Philippine Aerospace Development Corporation (PADC) is a state-owned aerospace and defense technological development corporation integrated to the Department of National Defense through Executive No. 78 s. 2019. As of 2021, PADC is under organizational realignment with the country's Department of National Defense's and National Security Council's highly classified plans and programs, including but not limited to its vital function as the epicenter for the implementation of Presidential Decree No. 415 s. 1974 and as amended by Presidential Decree No. 1081 s. 1977. PADC shall again, be one of the conduits of the continuous process of Republic Act No. 10349 s. 2012. PADC is the catalyst in the creation and implementation of Presidential Decree No. 1570 s. 1978.

History
The corporation was established on September 5, 1973, by the virtue of Presidential Decree No. 286, which was issued by then-President Ferdinand Marcos. The decree served as the charter of the corporation was revised through Presidential Decree  No. 696 issued by Marcos on May 9, 1975.

The mandate of the firm is to establish a "reliable aviation and aerospace industry" in the Philippines, design, manufacture and sell "all forms" of aircraft, as well as to develop indigenous capabilities in the maintenance, repair, and modification of aviation equipment.

It attempted to develop local aircraft such as the PADC Hummingbird helicopter and the PADC Defiant single-engine trainer in the 1980s but the programs were scrapped due to licensing issues and lack of government support.

Following a meeting of the Governance Commission for GOCCs in late 2017, the option of abolishing PADC was floated. Those present in the meeting citing that the PADC had failed its mandate particularly in successfully designing a plane for the last 45 years.

A PADC director, Rene Abad, called for the PADC's ‘revitalization’ instead, to contribute to the country's development and security.

On March 15, 2019, through Executive Order No. 78 signed by President Rodrigo Duterte, the corporation was effectively transferred from the transportation department to the Department of National Defense.

Prototypes
PADC Defiant 300 - is the first PADC developed Philippine light aircraft. A single prototype was made and the aircraft had its first test flight in 1987. Its fuselage is made of wood and fiberglass and had a Lycoming engine with a capacity of 300 horsepower. The project was abandoned due to lack of government funds.
PADC Hummingbird - a prototype helicopter developed from the 1980s to the 1990s which is considered as a copy of MBB Bo 105 of Eurocopter. The project was terminated due to the design being too lengthy and expensive, and design licensing issues.

See also
 Aerospace Industrial Development Corporation

References

Government-owned and controlled corporations of the Philippines
Companies based in Pasay
Technology companies established in 1973
Aerospace companies of the Philippines
Defence companies of the Philippines
Philippine companies established in 1973
Establishments by Philippine presidential decree